The 2009–10 National Premier League (known as the Digicell Premier League for sponsorship reasons) was contested by 12 teams.  The Championship was won by Harbour View F.C.  The season began September 6, 2009 and ended on May 16, 2010.

Format
The 12 teams will play 3 rounds (33 games) and then split. The top six teams will play in the Championship Playoff and the bottom six in the Relegation Playoff (5 games).  The bottom 2 teams will be relegated to the Super Leagues.

Standings

Regular stage

Championship playoff

Relegation playoff

References

National Premier League seasons
1
Jam